The Rural Municipality of Oakdale No. 320 is a rural municipality (RM) in the Canadian province of Saskatchewan within Census Division No. 13 and  Division No. 6. Located in the west-central portion of the province, it is near the Alberta boundary.

History 
The RM of Oakdale No. 320 incorporated as a rural municipality on December 13, 1909.

Geography

Communities and localities 
The following urban municipalities are surrounded by the RM.

Villages
 Coleville

The following unincorporated communities are within the RM.

Localities
 Beaufield (Ednaburg)
 Driver

Demographics 

Government 
The RM of Oakdale No. 320 is governed by an elected municipal council and an appointed administrator that meets on the second Monday of every month. The reeve of the RM is Darwin Whitfield while its administrator is Gillain Lund. The RM's office is located in Coleville.

Education 
Current school divisions
Sun West School Division No. 207 — As of 2006, the Kindersley School Division and 5 other divisions were amalgamated into the Sun West School Division.

Former amalgamated school divisions
Kindersley Schoold Division No. 34 (1947–2006)

Former 'single-room schoolhouse' school districts
Algoma School District No. 2876 (1914–1946)
Ashford School District No. 3773 (1916–1947)
Avoca School District No. 3363 (1914–1947)
Beaufield School District No. 3169 (1913–1947)
Bonn School District No. 2475 (1909–1947)
Buffalo Coulee School District No. 4278 (1919–1947)
Coleville School District No. 3645 (1915–1946)
Driver School District No. 811 (1912–1947)
Elm Point School District No. 2779 (1911–1947)
Eureka School District No. 2174 (1908–1947)
Gleneath School District No. 4453 (1921–1947)
Hopedale School District No. 346 (1911–1947)
McKellar School District No. 584 (1910–1947)
St. Florence School District No. 4299 (1920–1947)
Somme School District No. 4127 (19??-1947)
Teo Lake School District No. 1358 (1912–1947)
Warwick School District No. 3080 (1913–1940)

Transportation 
Rail
C.N.R. Dodsland Branch & mdash; served Beaufield, Coleville, and Driver
C.N.R. Outlook-Kerrobert Branch & mdash; served Ermine

Roads
Highway 21  
Highway 307 & mdash; serves Coleville

References 

O

Division No. 13, Saskatchewan